The Indian Vaccination Act is a US federal law was passed by the US Congress in 1832. The purpose of the act was to vaccinate the American Indians against smallpox to prevent the spread of the disease.

History 
The act was first passed on May 5, 1832. Lewis Cass, Secretary of War, designed the act. Members of Congress appropriated US$12,000 dollars (approximately $ in current money) to vaccinate them.  By February 1, 1833, more than 17,000 Indians had been vaccinated.

Congress allocated $12,000 for the entire program, to be administered by Indian agents and sub-agents. Some US army surgeons refused to participate due to the lack of funds, leaving agents themselves and others with no medical training to produce and administer vaccines. However, not everyone was included.  As a result, a few years later, smallpox killed 90% of the Mandan Indians, who had been excluded from the act. It also excluded Hidatsas and Arikaras.

References 

1832 in American law
Vaccination law
Vaccination in the United States
Smallpox in the United States
Smallpox eradication
Smallpox vaccines
United States federal Native American legislation